Tarmo Leinatamm (2 September 1957, Keila – 13 October 2014) was an Estonian conductor, comedian and politician. He was a member of X and XII Riigikogu.

He graduated from Tallinn State Conservatory.

1991-1994 he was the conductor of Estonian National Opera. 1994-1999 he was the director of Tallinn Philharmonic.

He was a member of Estonian Reform Party.

References

1957 births
2014 deaths
Estonian conductors (music)
Estonian comedians
Estonian television personalities
Estonian male television actors
Estonian radio personalities
Estonian Reform Party politicians
Members of the Riigikogu, 2003–2007
Members of the Riigikogu, 2011–2015
Estonian Academy of Music and Theatre alumni
Eurovision Song Contest entrants of 2008
Eurovision Song Contest entrants for Estonia
People from Keila
Burials at Metsakalmistu